Jumpin' in the Night is the sixth studio album by The Flamin' Groovies, released in 1979. It was produced by Cyril Jordan and Roger Bechirian.

Track listing

Personnel
Flamin' Groovies
 Cyril Jordan - guitar, vocals
 Chris Wilson - guitar, vocals
 Mike Wilhelm - guitar
 George Alexander - bass
 David Wright - drums

References

1979 albums
Flamin' Groovies albums
Albums produced by Roger Bechirian
Sire Records albums